Lisa Frank (born April 21, 1955) is an American businesswoman, the founder of Lisa Frank Incorporated, headquartered in Tucson, Arizona. She is known for producing whimsical commercial design for school supplies and other products that are primarily marketed to children.

Early life
Frank's father was an art collector and introduced her to the work of such Pop Art artists as Peter Max. Frank is a 1972 graduate of the Cranbrook Kingswood School, a preparatory school in Bloomfield Hills, Michigan.

Work 
Frank is the founder and CEO of Lisa Frank Incorporated. After moving from the Detroit, Michigan, area to Tucson, Arizona, in the 1970s to study art at the University of Arizona, she founded the children's jewelry company Sticky Fingers, which became Lisa Frank Inc. circa 1979 when she was 24. She continues to lead it as of 2019. Her corporation's artwork features rainbow and neon colors and stylized depictions of animals, including dolphins, pandas, and unicorns. In the 1980s and 1990s, her products – including school supplies such as lunchboxes and Trapper Keepers, as well as toys and stickers – were popular among elementary and middle school-aged girls. The company's headquarters is in Tucson, Arizona. The company no longer produces its own products and as of at least 2018 licenses its name to smaller companies.

In 2011, she launched a colorful line of clothing.

Collaborations 
Frank partnered with Reebok to release two versions of limited-release Reebok Classic Leathers shoes in 2017.

In 2017, Frank was partnering with producer Jon Shestack to develop a movie inspired by her work.

In 2019, Frank designed the logo for John Mayer's Instagram television series, Current Mood.

Personal life 

Frank is "notoriously elusive and private." In a 2012 interview video with Urban Outfitters, the company agreed to obscure her face.

In 1994, Frank married James A. Green, who from 1990 to October 2005 was president and chief executive officer of Lisa Frank Incorporated. They had 2 sons, Hunter (born in 1995) and Forrest (born in 1999). She filed for divorce in September 2005. That same month, she sued to remove Green from the company, and he resigned the following month. The court agreed to assign control of the company to Lisa Frank.

References

External links
 Official website

Living people
Cranbrook Educational Community alumni
American women illustrators
American illustrators
American women chief executives
1955 births
21st-century American women